Nira Konjit Wickramasinghe is professor of modern South Asian studies at Leiden University in the Netherlands and a well known international academic. She was a professor in the department of history and international relations, University of Colombo, Sri Lanka, until 2009. She grew up in Paris and studied at the University of Paris IV - Sorbonne from 1981 to 1984 and at the University of Oxford from 1985 to 1989, where she earned her doctorate in modern history. She joined the University of Colombo in 1990 and taught there until 2009. She has been a World Bank Robert McNamara fellow, a Fulbright senior scholar at New York University, a visiting professor at the Ecole des Hautes Etudes en Sciences Sociales in Paris, and more recently British Academy Fellow at St Antony's College, Oxford. She is currently working on a history of the reception of the sewing machine in colonial Sri Lanka, a topic which she researched while on sabbatical at the Shelby Cullom Davis Center for Historical Studies  Princeton University in 2008–2009.

Select publications
Wickramasinghe has published the following books:

 Sri Lanka in the Modern Age. A History'. Revised edn. New York, New Delhi : Oxford University Press, 2015
 Metallic Modern. Everyday Machines in Colonial Sri Lanka', Oxford: Berghahn Publ. 2014
 Sri Lanka in the modern age: A history of contested identities. London: Hurst & Co. and Honolulu: University of Hawaii press, 2006.
 Civil society in Sri Lanka: New circles of power. New Delhi: Sage Publications, c2001.
 Ethnic politics in colonial Sri Lanka, 1927–1947'. New Delhi: Vikas Pub. House, 1995.
 University space and values: Three essays''''. Colombo: International Centre for Ethnic Studies Colombo, 2005.
 L'Invention du Vetement national au Sri Lanka. Habiller le corps colonise'. Paris: Karthala Presse, 2006.

References

External linksSri Lanka’s conflict: culture and lineages of the past''

1964 births
Living people
20th-century Sri Lankan historians
Sinhalese academics
Sinhalese writers
University of Paris alumni
Alumni of the University of Oxford
Fellows of St Antony's College, Oxford
Academic staff of the University of Colombo
Sri Lankan women academics
21st-century Sri Lankan historians
20th-century Sri Lankan women writers
21st-century Sri Lankan women writers
Women historians
Historians of Sri Lanka